David Gottlieb may refer to:

 David Gottlieb (biologist) (1911–1982), American plant pathologist
 David Gottlieb (mathematician) (1944–2008), Israeli mathematician.
 David Gottlieb, founder of D. Gottlieb & Co.

See also 
 Dovid Gottlieb, faculty member at Ohr Somayach in Jerusalem